Zalkind Hourwitz (1751–1812) was a Polish Jew from Lublin living in Metz then Paris, active in the political discussions of the French Revolution. His essay, Vindication of the Jews, was one of three winning essays answering the Royal Society of Arts and Sciences in the city of Metz's question : "Are there means for making the Jews happier and more useful in France?"

From the essay:
The means of making the Jews happy and useful? This is it: stop making them unhappy and useless. Give them, or rather return to them the right of citizens, which you've denied them against all divine and human laws and against your own interests, like a man who thoughtlessly cripples himself.

In Vindication of the Jews, Hourwitz demands the full privileges of citizenship, including land ownership, occupational freedom and education. However, as a follower of the Enlightenment ideals, he also criticises the power which Jewish leaders have in the community and demands "rabbis and leaders must be severely forbidden from claiming the least authority over their co-religionists outside the synagogue."

Timeline of Hourwitz in the Revolution
August 1788—Hourwitz, along with Claude Antoine Thiery and Abbe Gregoire, wins the Metz Royal Society contest
March 1789—Publication of Vindication of the Jews
May 1789—Hourwitz appointed Secretaire-interprete of the Bibliothèque du Roi
September 1789--Journal de Paris includes a long review of Vindication of the Jews
October 1789—Hourwitz donates a quarter of his net salary to the Revolution
February 1790—Commune of Paris unanimously adopts resolution demanding the National Assembly acknowledge Jews as citizens
June 1790—Hourwitz appears before the National Assembly as part of "a delegation of foreigners"
October 1792—Hourwitz is dismissed from his position at Bibliothèque Nationale along with 11 others
January 1793—Hourwitz publicly states that he is against the execution of the king
December 1793- January 1794—Hourwitz appears before the revolutionary committee of the Reunion section
April 1794—Hourwitz demands from Saint-Just an "explanation" for the decree forbidding foreigners from residing in Paris or in ports.

References

1738 births
1812 deaths